M. K. Athmanathan (1925 – 15 July 2013) was a music director and lyricist in Tamil cinema. He was honoured by the Tamil Nadu government with the Kalaimamani award in 1978.
Her wife named thanlakshmi
He has two daughters and one son

Daughter
      Madhavi
      Amutha
Son 
   Elangovan

Early life 
Born in the village Valliyoor in Tirunelveli district of Tamil Nadu, India. He started life as a goldsmith but his interest in The arts made him to join the drama troupe of T. K. Shanmugam at the age of 11.

Career 
He entered the Tamil cinema in 1954 with the film Ratha Pasam as its music director. He also wrote 3 songs for the film.

He scored music for 20 films and penned lyrics for more than 120 songs.

Filmography

As music director 

Ratha Pasam (1954)
Naalu Veli Nilam (1959)
Malliyam Mangalam (1961)

As lyricist 

Ratha Pasam (1954)
Maheswari (1955)
Amara Deepam (1956)
Kula Deivam (1956)
Raja Rani (1956)
Rangoon Radha (1956)
Mallika (1957)
Pudhaiyal (1957)
Nadodi Mannan (1958)
Thedi Vandha Selvam (1958)
Thirumanam (1958)
Naalu Veli Nilam (1959)
Naatukoru Nallaval (1959)
Kalathur Kannamma (1960)
Petra Manam (1960)
Thilakam (1960)
Malliyam Mangalam (1961)
Naaga Nandhini (1961)
Nallavan Vazhvan (1961)
Thirudathe (1961)
Muthu Mandapam (1962)
Vikramadhithan 1962)
Ethaiyum Thangum Ithaiyam (1962)
Alli (1964)

Death 
Athmanathan died on 15 July 2013 at the age of 88.

References 

1925 births
2013 deaths
20th-century Indian poets
Tamil film poets
Tamil film score composers
People from Tirunelveli district